"Revolution" is a song by the English psychedelic rock band Tomorrow.  It was first released as a single in the UK by Parlophone in September 1967, and on the group's self-titled album Tomorrow in February 1968.  The song is credited to Keith Alan Hopkins (better known as Keith West) and Steve Howe. Though Tomorrow's song was not a hit, the group was well known to insiders of the London music scene.

Several different recordings of the song have been released by Tomorrow.  The 1999 CD re-issue of their album also includes a previously unreleased studio demo recording of the song.  This version does not have the orchestral overdubs but instead has some phasing effects not heard in the later recording.  Both were recorded at EMI's Abbey Road Studios in London in mid 1967.  Tomorrow performed this song for John Peel's radio show on the BBC, and there is also a live recording on the album 50 Minute Technicolor Dream.

AllMusic writer Richie Unterberger called "Revolution" an "infectious hippie anthem".

References

Songs about revolutions
1967 singles
Parlophone singles
Songs written by Steve Howe (musician)